Cecilie is a given name. Notable people with the name include:

Cecilie Broch Knudsen (born 1950), artist and rector of the Oslo National Academy of the Arts
Cecilie Henriksen (born 1986), football forward from Næstved, Denmark
Cecilie Løveid (born 1951), Norwegian novelist, playwright, lyricist and writer of children's books
Cecilie Landsverk (born 1954), Norwegian diplomat
Cecilie Leganger (born 1975), Norwegian team handball goalkeeper, World champion, Olympic medalist, European champion, etc.
Cecilie Skog (born 1974), Norwegian adventurer from Ålesund
Cecilie Tenfjord-Toftby (born 1970), Swedish Moderate Party politician
Cecilie Thomsen (born 1974), Danish actress and model
Cecilie Thorsteinsen, Norwegian team handball player
Cecilie Uttrup Ludwig, Danish cyclist
Cecilie (film), a 2007 Danish horror film
Duchess Cecilie of Mecklenburg-Schwerin (1886–1954), wife of German Crown Prince William, the son of German Emperor William II
Princess Cecilie of Greece and Denmark (1911–1937), the wife of Hereditary Grand Duke George Donatus of Hesse

See also
Herzogin Cecilie, German four mast barque named after German Crown Princess Duchess Cecilie of Mecklenburg-Schwerin
SS Kronprinzessin Cecilie, ocean liner built in Germany in 1906 for North German Lloyd

Danish feminine given names
Swedish feminine given names
Norwegian feminine given names